John Joseph Todd (born March 16, 1927) was a justice of the Minnesota Supreme Court from 1972 until his resignation on March 8, 1985.

References

Justices of the Minnesota Supreme Court
1927 births
Possibly living people
Place of birth missing (living people)